Serhiy Georgievich Kushniryuk (born 15 March 1956) is a retired Ukrainian handball player. He was part of the Soviet teams that won a gold medal at the 1976 Summer Olympics and placed second in 1980. He also won a gold and a silver medal at the world championships in 1978 and 1982.

References

1956 births
Living people
Soviet male handball players
Ukrainian male handball players
Handball players at the 1976 Summer Olympics
Handball players at the 1980 Summer Olympics
Honoured Masters of Sport of the USSR
Olympic handball players of the Soviet Union
Olympic gold medalists for the Soviet Union
Olympic silver medalists for the Soviet Union
Olympic medalists in handball
People from Chortkiv
Medalists at the 1980 Summer Olympics
Medalists at the 1976 Summer Olympics
ZTR players
Sportspeople from Ternopil Oblast